is a Japanese professional footballer who plays as a striker for Shonan Bellmare and the Japan national team. He was called-up for the national team to represent Japan at the 2022 FIFA World Cup, as a replacement for the injured Yuta Nakayama.

Club career

Before turning professional
Influenced by his older brother, he started playing soccer at the age of 3. During Junior High School, he played at FC Avenida Sol. Machino entered Riseisha High School in Osaka and became a regular player in there since the first grade. In his second year, he was selected for the high school selection, which caught the attention of Yokohama F. Marinos, who invited the young player in his third year to participate in trainings with the club. After successfully concluding his trainings, he was evaluated, and officially joined Yokohama F. Marinos from the 2018 season, after his High School graduation.

After turning professional
In 1 February 2019, Machino earned a loan transfer to Giravanz Kitakyushu from Yokohama F. Marinos. On Matchweek 11, he scored his first professional goal in his first time starting a match for the club in five games. On Matchweek 12, he scored another goal, scoring then, two goals in two consecutive games. Following decent performances for his club, he became a starting member after the 21st round, when the J3 League resumed, right after the first wave COVID-19 global threat. He became the team's top scorer at the end of the season. On 6 January 2020, he permanently transferred to Kitakyushu. After participating in the opening game of the same season, he started 5 consecutive games on the bench. After another league break due to another COVID-19 wave,from the 7th round, he participated in 29 consecutive games. Although he recorded 7 goals and 7 assists in the first half of the season, he was not able to replicate his performances for the remaining of it, having directly contributed to just 2 goals. On 26 December 2020, he was signed to Shonan Bellmare in a permanent transfer. On 21 and 25 May 2022, he scored two braces in two matches, scoring it on Shonan's 2–1 win over Vissel Kobe, and on a 4–0 win against Kawasaki Frontale, becoming the second player in club history since Wagner Lopes in 1998 to score braces in consecutive matches. At the end of the 2022 season, he finished second in the J1 League goalscoring rankings, scoring 13 goals, just one goal behind Brazilian Thiago Santana. Machino ended the season as the Japanese player with most goals scored during the season.

International career
On July 13, 2022, he was selected for the first time as a member of the Japan national football team, which is composed only of domestic groups participating in the 2022 EAFF E-1 Football Championship. On 19 July 2022, he scored two goals, including his first goal for the national team, against Hong Kong in the first match of the EAFF E-1 Football Championship 2022. On 27 July of the same year, he scored the game-deciding third goal in a match against South Korea national football team. He was selected to play in the 2022 FIFA World Cup by Hajime Moriyasu, the then Japan's national team manager, after an injury saw left-back Yuta Nakayama being ruled out of it.

Career statistics

.

Club

International 

 

International goals
Scores and results list Japan's goal tally first.

References

External links

1999 births
Living people
Japanese footballers
Association football people from Mie Prefecture
Association football forwards
Yokohama F. Marinos players
Giravanz Kitakyushu players
Shonan Bellmare players
J1 League players
J2 League players
J3 League players
2022 FIFA World Cup players